Una Damon (born Kim Una) is a South-Korean and American actress.

Her film credits include Gattaca, The Truman Show, Deep Impact, Deep Rising, and Spider-Man. Damon has acted in numerous television shows including Curb Your Enthusiasm, Charmed, Chicago Hope, Sliders, Girlfriends and The Closer. In 1995, she appeared in the film For Better or Worse. In 2006, she directed and starred in a short film which she also wrote and produced called Sixth Street Bridge.

Filmography

Film

Television

References

External links
 

American film actresses
American television actresses
Living people
1964 births
American people of South Korean descent
21st-century American women